Estonian Women's Volleyball Championships are the national volleyball championships for women held since 1925 in Estonia.

Medalists

See also
Estonian Volleyball Championships

References

External links
  Estonian League. women.volleybox.net 

National championships in Estonia
Volleyball in Estonia
Women's volleyball leagues
National volleyball leagues
Sports leagues established in 1925
1925 establishments in Estonia